Head of Christ is a c.1494 chalk and pastel study by Leonardo da Vinci for his The Last Supper. It measures 40 by 32 cm (15.75 by 12.6 in) and is now in the Pinacoteca di Brera.

References

1494 works
Collections of Pinacoteca di Brera
Drawings by Leonardo da Vinci
Jesus in art